Victoria Place (formerly known as The Peacocks) is a multi-storey shopping and leisure centre in Woking, Surrey, England construction of which completed in 1992 providing approximately 90 consumer service/retail units; nine varieties of daytime restaurants, fast food shops and cafés and a link to the area's largest theatre and cinema with entrances outside and within the centre itself. A further extension was constructed in the late 2010s as part of the adjacent Victoria Square project.

History
The  centre as Victoria Place formerly Woking Shopping was opened in April 1992 and contained a department store, a 1200-seat theatre, three cinemas, a nightclub and a library. A £1.5 million extension was added in 2010 that included a new entrance facing Town Square. Developed by the London and Edinburgh Trust including a partnership with Woking Council it was designed by Chapman Taylor Partners.  It was then owned by British Land until 2008 when it was sold to a private investor for £116 million.

References

External links
https://vpwoking.co.uk/

1992 establishments in England
Shopping centres in Surrey
Shopping malls established in 1992
Woking